92nd Brigade may refer to:

 92nd Mechanized Brigade of the Ukrainian Armed Forces
 92nd Brigade (United Kingdom)
 92nd Maneuver Enhancement Brigade (United States)

See also
 92nd Division (disambiguation)
 92nd Regiment (disambiguation)
 92nd Squadron (disambiguation)